Mike Mass (born October 29, 1951) is an American politician who served in the Oklahoma House of Representatives from the 17th district from 1990 to 2002 and from 2003 to 2006.

Mass, who has a gambling addiction, admitted to taking about $280,000 in kickbacks from a dog food company and a gaming machine manufacturer. He was sentenced to two years in prison on May 27, 2009.

References

1951 births
Living people
People from McAlester, Oklahoma
Democratic Party members of the Oklahoma House of Representatives
Oklahoma politicians convicted of crimes